Seyit Kırmızı (born 22 February 1950) is a Turkish former cyclist. He competed in the team time trial at the 1972 Summer Olympics.

References

External links
 

1950 births
Living people
Turkish male cyclists
Olympic cyclists of Turkey
Cyclists at the 1972 Summer Olympics
Sportspeople from Konya
20th-century Turkish people